James Clyde Mitchell  (usually known as J. Clyde Mitchell) (21 June 1918 Pietermaritzburg – 15 November 1995) was a British sociologist and anthropologist.

In 1937 Mitchell helped found the Rhodes-Livingstone Institute group of social anthropologists/sociologists, now a part of the University of Zambia. He was influenced by Max Gluckman and conducted important research on social network analysis at the University of Manchester (see Manchester School). In the 1940s he carried out field research into social systems and social conditions in Central Africa (southern Malawi) interviewing heads of households in villages and urban areas and observing customs. In 1952 he was on the editorial committee of the Northern Rhodesia Journal.

Mitchell studied network analysis and was a founding member of the International Network for Social Network Analysis, contributing to its Connections magazine.

For a detailed story of his life refer to the following by Susan J. Smith:
J. CLYDE MITCHELL James Clyde Mitchell 21 June 1918 – 15 November 1995 elected Fellow of the British Academy 1990
by SUSAN J. SMITH, Fellow of the Academy
https://www.thebritishacademy.ac.uk/documents/954/Memoirs_18-06-Mitchell.pdf

Publications
The Kalela dance: Aspects of social relationships among urban Africans in Northern Rhodesia, Manchester: Manchester University Press, 1956
The Yao Village: a Study in the Social Structure of a Malawian Tribe Manchester: Manchester University Press, 1956, 1966, 1971
Social Networks in Urban Situations: Analysis of Personal Relationships in Central African Towns Manchester: Manchester University Press, 1969
Networks, Norms & Institutions, 1973
Configurational Similarity in Three Class Contexts in British Society, in Sociology, Vol. 19, 1985
Cities, Society, and Social Perception: A Central African Perspective 1987

British sociologists
British women sociologists
British anthropologists
British women anthropologists
1918 births
1995 deaths
Academic staff of the University of Zambia
Academics of the University of Manchester
Fellows of the British Academy
People associated with the Rhodes-Livingstone Institute
People from Pietermaritzburg
20th-century anthropologists